The Badge of Marshal Brennan is a 1957 American Western film directed by Albert C. Gannaway and written by Tom Hubbard. The film stars Jim Davis, Arleen Whelan, Carl Smith, Harry Lauter, Marty Robbins, Douglas Fowley, Lee Van Cleef and Louis Jean Heydt. The film was released on April 14, 1957, by Allied Artists Pictures.

Plot
When a gun-toting drifter known as the Stranger (Jim Davis) comes across a dying marshal, he decides to take up the identity of the late lawman. Settling down in a small town, the Stranger uses his new-found authority to challenge Shad Donaphin (Lee Van Cleef), the violent and unruly son of a shady cattle baron. Intent on staying true to his adopted persona, the Stranger even strikes up a relationship with Murdock (Arleen Whelan), a beautiful local lady.

Cast          
Jim Davis as 'Brennan'
Arleen Whelan as Murdock
Carl Smith as Sheriff Carl Smith
Harry Lauter as Doc Hale
Marty Robbins as Felipe
Douglas Fowley as Marshal Matt Brennan 
Lee Van Cleef as Shad Donaphin
Louis Jean Heydt as Col. Donaphin
Lawrence Dobkin as Chicamon
Eddie Crandall as Pepe Joe
Darryl Guy as George
Rick Vallin as Jody 
Edward Colmans as Governor Ainley

References

External links
 

1957 films
American Western (genre) films
1957 Western (genre) films
Allied Artists films
1950s English-language films
Films directed by Albert C. Gannaway
1950s American films